The Amazing Mr X was a British comics character who appeared in British children's magazine The Dandy from 1944 to 1945. The character is regarded as Britain's first superhero. The comic was drawn by Jack Glass, and reappeared drawn by Dudley Watkins in the 1962 Dandy Book.

Publication history

The Amazing Mr.X first appeared in issue #244 of The Dandy in 1944. The original series lasted for only 14 issues until 1945. He returned for a one-off adventure in 1962 but that turned out to be the last comic appearance of the Character.

Legacy
Entrants of the 2012 Dundee Comics Prize were asked to create Amazing Mr X stories. The winner was cartoonist Steve Marchant with his humorous tale of an 88-year-old Mr X still attempting to fight the good fight.

Publisher DC Thomson brought the character back later that year for the digital relaunch of The Dandy, as part of a new story called Retro Active.

References

British comic strips
British comics characters
1944 comics debuts
1945 comics endings
British superheroes
Superhero comics
Comics characters introduced in 1944
Comics characters with superhuman strength
Male characters in comics
Dandy strips